Voice of Korea is the international broadcasting service of North Korea. It broadcasts primarily information in Chinese, Spanish, German, English, French, Russian, Japanese and Arabic. Until 2002 it was known as Radio Pyongyang. The interval signal is identical to that of Korean Central Television.

History
The origins of Voice of Korea can be traced to 1936 and the radio station JBBK. Operated by the occupying Japanese forces, JBBK broadcast a first and second program as part of Japan's radio network that covered the Korean Peninsula from  Seoul.

The station was founded in October 1945 as Radio Pyongyang, and officially inaugurated programming on the 14th, with a live broadcast of the victory speech of Kim Il-sung when he returned to Pyongyang at the end of World War II.

The first foreign broadcast was in Chinese on 16 March 1947. Japanese-language broadcasts began in 1950, followed by English (1951), French and Russian (1963), Spanish (1965), Arabic (1970), and German (1983).

By 1960, Radio Pyongyang broadcast 159 hours of programming every week. In 1970, weekly broadcasting hours totaled 330 hours and by 1980, 597 hours. In 1990 weekly broadcasting time fell to 534 hours per week, 529 in 1994, and 364 in 1996.

In 2002, the station was renamed Voice of Korea.

Programming 
Unlike most international broadcasters, Voice of Korea does not broadcast an interval signal in the minutes leading up to the start of the transmission. It instead starts broadcasting the interval signal (the first few notes of the "Song of General Kim Il-sung") on the hour.

A typical program line-up begins with the interval signal, followed by the station announcement "This is Voice of Korea". After the announcement, the national anthem, "Song of General Kim Il-sung" and "Song of General Kim Jong-il" are played. The songs are followed by a news broadcast consisting of Korean Central News Agency items with small adjustments for the radio. If there are any items about Kim Il-sung, Kim Jong-il or Kim Jong-un, these are the top bulletins. On the station's website, Kim Jong Un's full name is used whenever he is mentioned in a story, and his name (as well as those of Kim Il Sung and Kim Jong Un) appear in font larger than the rest of the story's text.

The news items are typically one day behind the news of the domestic service Korean Central Broadcasting Station. The news is followed by music and an excerpt from Kim Il-sung's memoirs With the Century. After the memoirs, there is more music and feature stories, sometimes followed by an editorial. The 57-minute broadcast concludes with frequency information and a sign-off message.

In the past, the station broadcast coded messages to North Korean spies. This practice ended with the 2000 June 15th North–South Joint Declaration. In 2006, Voice of Korea started broadcasting on  11545 kHz, the same frequency as the former Lincolnshire Poacher numbers station. While it is unknown whether this was an intentional effort to interfere with Poacher's propagation or an accident, it is not unknown for Voice of Korea to unintentionally jam its own signal by transmitting programmes in different languages simultaneously on the same frequency.

Broadcasting
Voice of Korea broadcasts on HF or shortwave radio frequencies, as well as on medium wave for broadcasts aimed at neighboring countries. Some frequencies are well out of the ITU-allocated shortwave broadcast bands, making them less susceptible to interference and less likely to be listenable on older receivers. Recently, it has increased the share of satellite broadcasting.

Most of the broadcasts are transmitted from the Kujang shortwave transmitter site (five 200 kW transmitters), approximately 25 km from the city of Kujang.  A transmitter site in Kanggye (also five 200 kW) is used as well. A site in Pyongyang (10 transmitters of 200 kW) is also in use.

On occasion, Voice of Korea has missed its regular service. The interruptions have not been explained by Voice of Korea, but they are thought to be due to engineering works at the transmitter sites, faulty equipment or because of power outages. In 2012 they occurred when the country was facing one of its worst electricity shortages in years. The off-air periods also affect North Korea's own jamming signals designed to prevent reception of South Korean stations such as Echo of Hope, Voice of the People, and KBS Hanminjok Radio.

Voice of Korea broadcasts on the ChinaSat 12 satellite along with Korean Central Broadcasting Station (KCBS) and Korean Central Television.

Currently (as of 11 March 2021) it seems, that several foreign language programmes are identical to each other, as exactly the same music is played at the same time, only the spoken and translated parts of the programme have been amended to match the respective program language. This could be monitored by switching from the German evening program on 6170 kHz from 19:00 UTC to the Spanish program on 7570 kHz at 19:00 UTC and back. It also seems, that the shortwave transmitter, which is used for the German language service, has a rather bad modulation. The transmitter for the Spanish programme however seems in better shape.

Schedules 
This is a list of broadcasts of Voice of Korea by language as of August 2019. All times are in UTC.

Arabic 
All Arabic broadcasts are transmitted from Kujang.

Chinese 
All Chinese broadcasts are transmitted from Kujang.

English 
All English broadcasts are transmitted from Kujang.

French 
All French broadcasts are transmitted from Kujang.

German 
All German broadcasts are transmitted from Kujang (frequency update: 03/2021, as announced on air, see also ADDX)

Japanese 
All Japanese broadcasts are transmitted from Kujang, except 621 kHz and 6070 kHz broadcasts, which are transmitted from Chongjin-Ranam and Kanggye respectively.

Russian 
All Russian broadcasts are transmitted from Kujang.

Spanish 
All Spanish broadcasts are transmitted from Kujang (frequency update: 03/2021, as announced on air, see also ADDX)

See also

Propaganda in North Korea
List of radio stations in North Korea
Censorship in North Korea
Media of North Korea

References

Works cited

External links

Some excerpts of North Korean coded messages broadcast by Radio Pyongyang for secret agents with explanations
Archive of English Language Broadcasts

International broadcasters
Radio stations in North Korea
North Korean propaganda organizations
Propaganda radio broadcasts
Radio stations established in 1945
1945 establishments in Korea
Shortwave radio stations